Eben-Haeser Jansen  (born 5 June 1954 in Griekwastad, Northern Cape, South Africa) is a former South African rugby union player.

Playing career
Jansen played for the Free State in the South African Currie Cup competition. He made his test debut for the Springboks during the 1981 tour of New Zealand in the first test on 15 August 1981 at Lancaster Park in Christchurch. He did not play in any further tests, but represented the Springboks in 10 tour matches and scored four tries.

Test history

See also
List of South Africa national rugby union players – Springbok no. 518

References

1954 births
Living people
South African rugby union players
South Africa international rugby union players
Free State Cheetahs players
People from Siyancuma Local Municipality
Rugby union players from the Northern Cape
Rugby union flankers